The 2003–04 Divizia B was the 64th season of the second tier of the Romanian football league system.

The format has been changed from two series of 16 teams to three series, each of them consisting of 16 teams. At the end of the season, the winners of the series promoted to Divizia A and the last three places from all the series relegated to Divizia C.

Team changes

To Divizia B
Promoted from Divizia C
 Petrolul Moinești
 Unirea Urziceni
 Juventus București
 Dacia Mioveni
 Rarora Râmnicu Vâlcea
 Jiul Petroșani
 Oltul Sfântu Gheorghe
 Armătura Zalău
 FC Vaslui
 Poiana Câmpina
 Electrica Constanța
 Chindia Târgoviște
 Minerul Motru
 Certej
 Tricotaje Ineu
 Laminorul Roman
 Building Vânju Mare
 ACU Arad
 Precizia Săcele
 Oașul Negrești
 Callatis Mangalia

Relegated from Divizia A
 Sportul Studențesc București
 UTA Arad

From Divizia B
Relegated to Divizia C
 Bucovina Suceava
 Gilortul Târgu Cărbunești
 Foresta Fălticeni
 UM Timișoara

Promoted to Divizia A
 Petrolul Ploiești
 Apulum Alba Iulia
 FC Oradea

Other
Divizia A clubs and bitter rivals, Petrolul Ploiești and Astra Ploiești merged. Astra was absorbed by Petrolul and Oțelul Galați, which initially relegated after the promotion/ relegation play-off against FC Oradea, remained in the top-flight.

Callatis Mangalia was promoted from Divizia C as the best next runner-up, in order to occupy the vacant place.

Renamed teams
Chindia Târgoviște was renamed as FCM Târgoviște.

CS Certej merged with Mureșul Deva, was moved from Certeju de Sus to Deva and renamed as CS Deva.

Extensiv Craiova was renamed as FC Craiova.

League tables

Seria I

Serie II

Seria III

Top scorers 
20 goals
  Ionuț Mazilu (Sportul Studențesc)

17 goals
  Gabriel Apetri (Jiul Petroșani)

13 goals
  Viorel Gheorghe (Petrolul Moinești)
  Cristian Turcu (CFR Cluj)

12 goals
  Răzvan Cociș (Universitatea Cluj)
  Florin Anghel (FC Vaslui)
  Valentin Badea (FC Vaslui)

11 goals
  Robert Roszel (Olimpia Satu Mare)

9 goals
  Iulian Ștefan (Pandurii Târgu Jiu)
  Florin Maxim (Sportul Studențesc)

8 goals
  Constantin Barbu (Dacia Mioveni)
  Marius Păcurar (Politehnica Iași)

7 goals

  Constantin Borza (Midia Năvodari)
  Damian Militaru (Jiul Petroșani)
  Tiberiu Bălan (Sportul Studențesc)
  Gigel Ene (Rulmentul Alexandria)
  Dan Codreanu (Universitatea Cluj)

See also 

2003–04 Divizia A

References 

Liga II seasons
Rom
2003–04 in Romanian football